A public body is commonly a statutory corporation created by a state.

“Public body” may also refer to:
Administrative division or public body, a political division of a country
Public body (Netherlands)
Scottish public bodies

See also
 Non-departmental public body